Aldo Vera Serafin (c. 1933 – October 26, 1976) was a Cuban exile who was once a top police official for Prime Minister Fidel Castro. He later split with Castro.

Background
In January 1959, he was named head of the technical investigations department, the main intelligence organ of the Cuban police. Vera became disenchanted with socialism and fled Cuba early in the 1960s. On October 26, 1976, Vera was hit with two shots fired from an automobile in a suburb of San Juan, Puerto Rico, as he was stepping out of a bakery on the way to a meeting with members of an anti-Castro political group. Serafin died almost immediately. His death has never been officially been solved.

See also
List of unsolved murders

References

1976 deaths
1933 births
Cuban anti-communists
Cuban revolutionaries
Government ministers of Cuba
Male murder victims
People murdered in Puerto Rico
People of the Cuban Revolution
Unsolved murders in Puerto Rico

1976 murders in Puerto Rico